Constance of Toulouse was the daughter of Raymond VI, Count of Toulouse and his second wife Beatrice of Béziers.

She first married Sancho VII of Navarre in 1195, but they were divorced in 1200. After the annulment she remarried to Peter Bermond II of Sauve.

With her second husband, Constance had the following children:
Peter Bermond, succeeded his father and had issue
Raymond, ancestor of the Barons de Florac
Bermond, ancestor of the Barons de Caylar
unnamed daughter, married Hugh de Mirabel
unnamed daughter, betrothed to Arnaud de Roquefeuil
Sibylle, married Barral of Baux

References

Sources

12th-century nobility from the Kingdom of Navarre
Occitan nobility
Remarried royal consorts
Navarrese royal consorts